The 2015–16 Asian Le Mans Series was the fourth season of the Automobile Club de l'Ouest's Asian Le Mans Series. It is the fourth 24 Hours of Le Mans-based series created by the ACO, following the American Le Mans Series (since merged with the Rolex Sports Car Series to form the United SportsCar Championship), the European Le Mans Series and the FIA World Endurance Championship. The four event season began at the Fuji Speedway on 10 October 2015 and ended at Sepang International Circuit in Selangor on 24 January 2016.

Calendar
The 2015 calendar was revealed on 12 February 2015.  An updated race calendar was released on 20 April 2015, which added the round at Buriram and rescheduled the Sepang round, before a further revised calendar cancelled the planned event at Shanghai International Circuit and replaced it with a second race in Sepang. The Fuji round will be held alongside the FIA World Endurance Championship.

Entry list
All entries use Michelin tyres.

LMP2

LMP3

CN

GT

Results
Bold indicates overall winner.

Championship Standings

Championship Race points

Teams Championships

LMP2 Teams Championship

LMP3 Teams Championship

CN Teams Championship

GT Teams Championship

GT Am Teams Championship

Drivers Championships

LMP2 Drivers Championship

LMP3 Drivers Championship

CN Drivers Championship

GT Drivers Championship

GT Am Drivers Championship

Notes

References

External links
 

Asian Le Mans Series seasons
Asian Le Mans Series
Asian Le Mans Series
Le Mans Series
Le Mans Series